Norman Lee Swartout, Sr. (April 17, 1879 - October 30, 1930) was an American playwright. He was the editor and manager of the play department for Longman, Green & Co. He became the director of the Summit Playhouse in 1918.

Biography
He was born in Auburn, New York on April 17, 1879. He attended the University of Rochester where he was a member of the Alpha Delta Phi fraternity and graduated around 1901. He made his stage debut Don Caesar's Return with James Keteltas Hackett at Wallack's Theatre in Manhattan. He wrote the farcical play The Arrival of Kitty in 1906.

He married Helen Louise Briggs around 1912. They had two children: Norman Lee Swartout, Jr. (born 1914) who married Hildegarde Spindler; and Barbara Swartout.

He became the director of the Summit Playhouse in 1918.

He died on October 30, 1930 in Summit, New Jersey, he was 51 years old.

Plays
The Toastmaster 
Half Back Sandy 
One of the Eight 
The Arrival of Kitty (1906) 
One of The: A College Comedy in Four Acts (1908)
Every Man For Himself 
Close to Nature: A Farcical Episode in the Life of an American Family, in Four Acts (1915)

External links

References

1879 births
1930 deaths
University of Rochester alumni